Greenwood is a neighborhood of Louisville, Kentucky located along Cane Run Road and Greenwood Road. It is sometimes referred to by its large industrial park and shipping facility, Riverport.

Geography

This region of Louisville is also known as Pleasure Ridge Park, Louisville.

References
 

Neighborhoods in Louisville, Kentucky